Thrilled is the seventh studio album by the pop punk band Punchline, released as a follow-up to 2012's So Nice To Meet You through InVogue Records on December 4, 2015 and distributed by Warner Music Group.

It is noted to be the group's most eclectic effort yet.

Track listing
 "Thrilled" – 3:35
 "Now I See" – 4:04
 "Tell Me How You Sleep" – 4:20
 "No Stopping Us" – 3:58
 "Telephone Pole" – 4:33
 "Let It Rise" – 3:23
 "Oh, Sierra" – 4:09
 "Answer Me" – 3:27
 "Simulation" – 4:32
 "Green Hills" – 4:40

References

Punchline (band) albums
2015 albums
InVogue Records albums